Michael Lindsay (May 9, 1963 – August 31, 2019) was an American voice actor who worked largely in anime, credited often as Dylan Tully.

His most prominent roles were Kisuke Urahara in Bleach, Kankuro in Naruto, Greymon and Joe Kido in Digimon, and Amuro Ray in the first three Mobile Suit Gundam compilation films.

Personal life and career
Lindsay was born in Washington, D.C., but moved at a young age to New York City. He received a degree in theatre from Adelphi University.

In 2012, Lindsay retired from voice acting and most of his anime roles were recast to Doug Erholtz.

Death
Lindsay died on August 31, 2019, at the age of 56. He was living in Laurel, Maryland at the time of his death. He was surrounded by his wife and his two children. The cause of his death has not been revealed.

Dubbing roles

Animated series English dubbing
 Bleach - Kisuke Urahara (eps. 1–231), Sentarō Kotsubaki (ep. 40), Rudbornn Chelute (ep. 153)
 Code Geass - Shinichirō Tamaki
 Cromartie High School - Maeda's Mom (Madstone Version)
 Digimon Adventure/Digimon Adventure 02 Greymon, Joe Kido
 Digimon Data Squad - Gotsumon
 Dinozaurs - Rick
 Fushigi Yûgi - Tomite
 Kaze no Yojimbo - George Kodama
 Marmalade Boy - Yuu Matsuura
 Mobile Suit Gundam (Movies I-III English Dub) - Amuro Ray (as Dylan Tully)
 Naruto - Kankuro
 Naruto: Shippuden - Kankuro (2005 - 2012)
 Outlaw Star - Tobigera
 s-CRY-ed - Kyoji Mujo
 Serial Experiments Lain - Delivery Guy (ep. 2) (as Dylan Tully)
 The Big O - Police (ep. 22)
 Transformers: Robots in Disguise - Rollbar, Skid-Z
 Vampire Princess Miyu - Man, Man on Bike, Mr. Sone, Policeman, Shidon
 Wolf's Rain - Driver (ep.6), Additional Voices
 Zatch Bell! - Apollo

Animated film English dubbing
 Akira - Yamagata (as Dylan Tully) (2001 Pioneer dub)
 Bleach: Memories of Nobody - Kisuke Urahara
 Bleach: The DiamondDust Rebellion - Kisuke Urahara
 Cowboy Bebop: The Movie - Taxi Driver
 Digimon: The Movie - Joe Kido, Greymon
 Digimon Adventure 02: Revenge of Diaboromon - Joe Kido
 Naruto the Movie 2: Legend of the Stone of Gelel - Kankuro

Video games English dubbing
 Bleach: Shattered Blade - Kisuke Urahara
 Bleach: The Blade of Fate - Kisuke Urahara
 Bleach: Dark Souls - Kisuke Urahara
 Bleach: The 3rd Phantom - Kisuke Urahara
 Final Fantasy XIII - Additional Voices
 Gundam Side Story 0079: Rise from the Ashes - Additional Voices
 Shadow of Rome - Cassius Longiness, Additional Voices
 Zatch Bell! Mamodo Fury - Apollo
 Naruto series - Kankuro

Filmography

Animated series
The Grim Adventures of Billy & Mandy - Bobby (Episode: "Whatever Happened to Billy Whatsisname?")
The Mullets - (Episode: "Touched by a Mullet")
Squirrel Boy - Cop

References

External links

American male video game actors
American male voice actors
2019 deaths
1963 births
Adelphi University alumni
Male actors from Washington, D.C.
20th-century American male actors
21st-century American male actors